This is a list of airports in Hungary, grouped by type and sorted by location.

Hungary is a landlocked country in the Carpathian Basin in Central Europe. It is bordered by Austria, Slovakia, Ukraine, Romania, Serbia, Croatia, and Slovenia. The capital city is Budapest.

Hungary is subdivided administratively into 20 regions which are the 19 counties (megyék, singular: megye) and the capital city (főváros) of Budapest. These are further subdivided into 198 townships (járások).


Airports

ICAO location indicators link to airport page at HungaryAirport.hu.

See also 
 Hungarian Air Force
 Transport in Hungary
 List of airports by ICAO code: L#LH – Hungary
 Wikipedia:WikiProject Aviation/Airline destination lists: Europe#Hungary

References 

 HungaryAirport.hu (airport info in English and Hungarian)
 Malév Hungarian Airlines
 
 
  – includes IATA codes
 
 

 
Hungary
Airports
Airports
Hungary